Veer Balak Smarak is a memorial museum dedicated to the victims of 2001 Gujarat earthquake in Anjar, Kutch district, Gujarat, India.

History
The memorial is dedicated to the 185 school children and 20 teachers who died during the 2001 Gujarat earthquake while holding a rally on the Republic Day of India. The project to construct memorial was probably announced in 2008. Following several delays, the project was approved by the Government of Gujarat in 2017 and the construction was started in 2018. It was inaugurated on 28 August 2022 by Prime Minister Narendra Modi.

Features
There are five sections in the memorial museum. The first "Memories of the past" section displays names of the victims. The second "The destruction" section has debris from the earthquake along with display of belongings and replicas of belongings of the victims. The third "Experience" section has an earthquake simulator while the fourth  "Science and Knowledge" section shows the science behind the earthquake. The final gallery section called "Think about it" asks the visitor various questions about one's experience.

The memorial is constructed outside the museum with a wall displaying names and images of the victims. The bright light called "Prakashpunj" light ups the memorial and can be seen from anywhere in the town. There is also an auditorium.

See also 

 Smritivan Earthquake Memorial and Museum

References

Museums in Gujarat
Local museums in India
Museums established in 2022
2022 establishments in Gujarat
Tourist attractions in Kutch district